Operation Sabotage is a text adventure game by Ray Sato for the TRS-80 and published by SoftSide Magazine in 1982. It was ported by Rich Bouchard to the Atari 8-bit family and translated for Apple II by Ron Shaker and later the IBM Personal Computer by Fred Condo & Kerry Shetline.  The game was republished in The Best of SoftSide (1983), which also included the program on an accompanying 5¼-inch floppy disk.

References

External links 
 

1980s interactive fiction
1982 video games
Apple II games
Atari 8-bit family games
Commercial video games with freely available source code
SoftSide games
TRS-80 games
Video games developed in the United States